Innokentyevka is a rural locality (a selo) and the administrative center of Innokentyevsky Selsoviet of Arkharinsky District, Amur Oblast, Russia. The population was 405 in 2018. There are 12 streets.

Geography 
Innokentyevka is located on the left bank of the Amur River, 36 km southwest of Arkhara (the district's administrative centre) by road. Krasny Luch is the nearest rural locality.

References 

Rural localities in Arkharinsky District